Anthony "Ant" Keith West, (born 17 July 1981 in Maryborough, Queensland), is an Australian motorcycle road racer. He most recently raced in the 2019 Brazilian Superbike Championship for the Kawasaki Racing Team.
West was suspended from participating at any FIM sanctioned events for 24 months due to testing positive for banned substances from 8 July 2018 to 14 September 2020.
In 2018 he competed in the Supersport World Championship, aboard a Kawasaki ZX-6R and in the Asia Road Race SS600 Championship, aboard a Yamaha YZF-R6.
 
During 2017 he has raced in the Supersport World Championship (600 cc) and the Asia Road Race SS600 Championship initially aboard a Yamaha YZF-R6 followed by a Kawasaki ZX-6R, and also selected events in the Superbike World Championship on a Kawasaki ZX-10R as a stand-in rider for Puccetti Kawasaki.

West has won two races in Grands Prix, the 2003 Dutch TT in the 250 cc class, and the 2014 Dutch TT in the Moto2 class. He is known as "The Rain Man" because of his ability to ride well in the extreme wet, which he attributes to a dirt track racing background.
He currently races in the Australian Superbike Championship.

Career

500cc World Championship
In 2001, he was a 500cc rider for the Dee Cee Jeans Racing Team, scoring minor points in 12 of the 16 races to place 18th overall.

In 2002, he had a year away from motorcycling as he could not gather enough sponsorship to secure a factory Aprilia ride.

Return to 250cc
In the 2003 and 2004 seasons, West rode for the Italian Abruzzo Racing team, running a privateer Aprilia both years. 2003 was the more successful of the years, he won a race and achieved three additional podium places.

2005 was supposed to be his big break, but a factory deal with KTM saw him miss three quarters of the season due to a lack of development and several mechanical failures. However, West rode the KTM to a podium place on debut, placing second in the rain soaked British Grand Prix at Donington Park.

Early in the 2007 season, he rode in the 250cc World Championship on a semi-factory, LE Aprilia run by Matteoni Racing. A disappointing start to the season saw West unable to match the times he set on the Kiefer Bos bike in 2006, with a best result of ninth after the fourth round of seventeen, leading him to quit the team.

However, West enjoyed more success when, at the Monza round of the 2007 World Supersport Championship, he rode through the field from 18th on the grid to finish 3rd, while substituting for injured compatriot Kevin Curtain on his first visit to the track, on his first race aboard the Yamaha. Then, in the following World Supersport round at the historic Silverstone circuit, West secured victory in a wet race. He repeated this feat again at Misano. He finished the championship in ninth place, despite only contesting three of the thirteen rounds.

Return to MotoGP
Following the retirement of Olivier Jacque in June 2007, West was offered the position to race with the Kawasaki Racing Team in MotoGP and aboard the Ninja ZX-RR for the remainder of the season, buying out his contract with Yamaha. He made a good debut at the British Grand Prix, reaching fourth position, but then crashing and eventually finishing 11th. His first four races each saw him finish progressively higher, with seventh at Mazda Raceway Laguna Seca and eighth at the Sachsenring. He was seventh again in the wet at Motegi, but could have been even higher. Starting 6th, he jumped the start fractionally – by the time the ride-through penalty was handed out, he was leading the race. Teammate Randy de Puniet came second amidst an all-Bridgestone podium, emphasising the missed opportunity. In his home country's Grand Prix the Australian's error caused him to only finish 12th while compatriot Casey Stoner won aboard his Ducati.

At the following race in Malaysia, Sepang, West qualified an impressive fifth behind teammate Randy de Puniet but was yet again given a ride through penalty, this time for lining up incorrectly on the starting grid. West climbed his way back through the field to 15th, capturing one championship point.

West remained with Kawasaki full-time for 2008, joined by John Hopkins. However, he did not achieve great success, and spent much of the season as the last of the 18 regular riders in the championship. There was improvement at Brno however; he qualified sixth in the wet and carried the form over into a dry race, finishing fifth in a race dominated by Bridgestone tyred bikes.

It had already been announced on the Saturday at Brno that West would not be riding for Kawasaki in the 2009 season. Kawasaki reportedly offered him a ride in another championship (which would likely be the Supersport World Championship, in which he competed briefly in 2007); West did not immediately reveal whether he had accepted or declined this offer.

Due to Kawasaki team manager Michael Bartholemy's stated desire to keep West in the Kawasaki family, West was rumoured to be an outside chance to ride a third Kawasaki in MotoGP, which would have been run by Jorge Martínez 'Aspar', who runs the Aspar 125cc and 250cc teams. However, West was never officially mentioned and it transpired that Martinez and his sponsors were only interested in hiring a Spanish rider, a factor that resulted in the team's entry to MotoGP being postponed until after 2009 when no suitable rider could be found.

On 16 October 2008 it was announced that West had signed to ride for the Stiggy Honda team for the 2009 World Supersport Championship, cutting his ties with Kawasaki.

Moto2 World Championship
For 2010 West raced in the new Moto2 class.

2012
For 2012, West was scheduled to ride for the Speed Master team in MotoGP with their CRT Spec Aprilia RSV-4, however he failed to raise the sponsorship necessary and the ride went to Mattia Pasini. West then signed with Supersonic Racing, riding the BMW S1000RR in the British Superbike Championship after narrowly missing out on a ride with Swan Yamaha.

Further drama was to come however, when West's fellow countryman Damian Cudlin was dropped from the QMMF Moto2 Team after struggling with the Moriwaki machine in pre-season testing. West quickly signed with the team, less than a week before the season opener in Qatar. He subsequently left the British Superbike Championship to race in Moto2 full-time.

From Mugello onwards, West raced the Speed Up chassis in place of the struggling Moriwaki. He achieved two season best results of second at Malaysia and his home Grand Prix in Phillip Island.

On 31 October, it was announced that a sample that West had provided for testing at the French Grand Prix contained traces of methylhexanamine, a banned substance. West was stripped of his seventh-place finish in the French Grand Prix and was banned from competing in any FIM-sanctioned race for one month.

2013
For 2013, West continued with the QMMF Moto2 Team alongside Indonesian rider Rafid Topan Sucipto who replaced West at Valencia following his ban. In November 2013 the Court of Arbitration for Sport ruled on an appeal by the World Anti-Doping Agency against the decision of the Fédération Internationale de Motocyclisme to only ban West for one month following his positive drug test in 2012. The court retrospectively increased the ban to 18 months and all his results between 20 May 2012 and 19 October 2013 were voided.

2014
In 2014, West remained again with QMMF Racing Team, this time partnered by Spanish rookie Roman Ramos. Both raced in the Italian Speed Up.

West started very well the season, finishing the first five races in points positions, with a best of 7th place at the American GP. While Ràmos always struggled with the Speed Up (he never scored points) West was always fighting for points and he was the best Speed Up rider in a field almost dominated by Kalexs.

At the Dutch TT, West qualified in a poor 23rd position out of 34 riders. But in a wet-drying race where most riders struggled, West once again showed his amazing wet ability and climbed up in first position, to win his second career world championship win, once again in the Dutch TT after his 2003 win. He was the first non-Kalex rider to win that year. Only two other non-Kalex riders won a race that year, both on a Suter. He climbed up to 8th position after that win.

He rarely scored points again after that Dutch win, and he finished in 12th position with 72 points. He scored 3 more points than rookie Sam Lowes, so he was the best Speed Up rider that season.

West was confirmed once again to ride with the QMMF team for the 2015 season.

2015
In 2015, West was partnered this time by a more competitive rider than the others, Spain's Julián Simón.

This time West's performance were not so good. He often struggled in qualifying and he always had to regain positions in the race, going to the limits and retiring more often than previous years.

Tensions with the team didn't help and when West was finally in the midpoints positions, he was sacked by the team after the San Marino GP. He was replaced by Mika Kallio.

He did not race the remaining five races and he finished the season in 22nd position, with 30 points. His best races were at Austin and a wet Silverstone, where he finished 7th in both occasions.

2016
West has raced in World Supersport Championship in 2016 with a wildcard entry in his home race with team Tribeca Racing riding a Yamaha YZF-R6. He finished the race at third position. He also entered the Assen race with his self-sponsored team called West Racing, but he did not race.

West competed in World Superbike with Pedercini replacing Lucas Mahias. At Sepang West finished the race in 9th in the first race and 5th in the second race in wet conditions. He raced for all but two races onwards, always finishing on points scoring positions, except in one race when he retired. He finished 17th in the standings with 64 points.

West made a wildcard appearance with Montaze Broz Racing in Moto2 aboard a Suter at the 2016 Czech Republic motorcycle Grand Prix, he started 28th on the grid and finished in 10th place on rain-affected conditions, one of the two drivers who scored points in a Suter that year.

He finished sixth in the Asia Road Race SS600 Championship with 3 wins, the only rider able to do that.

Supersport & Superbike World Championship

2017
For 2017, West re-entered his private West Racing team in the Supersport World Championship. At Phillip Island, he finished once again in third position. He did not raced in Thailand and Aragon, though he entered the Spanish race. He finished in points scoring positions in every race he entered that year. At Assen he finished 14th. At Imola he finished 11th. At Donington Park he managed a 7th place, at Misano a 10th place and at the Lausitzring he finished 8th. West finished the season in 8th place with 83 points.

He also raced in the Monterey Peninsula round of the MotoAmerica SuperBike Championship, where he finished in 5th and 8th place, resulting in a total of 19 points and a current 17th place in the standings.

West entered four races in the World Superbike Championship for the Puccetti Kawasaki Racing team at the Portuguese and French rounds, replacing injured Randy Krummenacher. He scored 13 points with an 8th place in Race 2 at the Algarve's Portimao Circuit being his best result, before switching to the Puccetti Supersport 600 machine for the last two meetings of the year, due to Kenan Sofuoğlu's injuries and Kyle Ryde's termination by the team leaving machines available. The Puccetti Superbike was taken over by Sylvain Guintoli.

Return to racing

2021
For 2021, West returned to racing in the Australian Superbike Championship. He started racing in the second round of the season for Moto-Go Yamaha Team aboard a Yamaha YZF-R1.
In his first race back, West finished 8th out of 20 drivers while in the second he finished in 10th place.

Career statistics

Grand Prix motorcycle racing

By season

By class

Races by year
(key) (Races in bold indicate pole position, races in italics indicate fastest lap)

Supersport World Championship

Races by year
(key) (Races in bold indicate pole position, races in italics indicate fastest lap)

Superbike World Championship

Races by year
(key) (Races in bold indicate pole position, races in italics indicate fastest lap)

References

External links

1981 births
Living people
Australian motorcycle racers
125cc World Championship riders
250cc World Championship riders
500cc World Championship riders
Supersport World Championship riders
Kawasaki Motors Racing MotoGP riders
People from Maryborough, Queensland
Moto2 World Championship riders
Doping cases in motorcycle racing
Superbike World Championship riders
MotoGP World Championship riders